Ohlendorffia is a genus of plants of the family Scrophulariaceae.  Mostly shrubs, they are native to Africa.

Scrophulariaceae
Scrophulariaceae genera
Flora of Africa